Adventurous Journeys Capital Partners (AJ Capital Partners) is a private real estate company based in Nashville that owns and operates lodging accommodations.

History 
AJ Capital Partners was founded by Ben Weprin, the current CEO, in 2008.  Other projects have included restorations of existing hotels and development of new properties, several located in Chicago and Nashville, such as Chicago Athletic Association, Soho House Chicago, Thompson Chicago and Hotel Lincoln, as well as Thompson Nashville in Nashville.

The company launched the Graduate Hotels chain in 2014.

In 2012, AJ Capital Partners collaborated with Soho House Group to develop a rubber belt factory in Chicago's West Loop into a Soho House, an urban, members only club and hotel.

In 2021, AJ Capital Partners announced the Marine & Lawn Hotels & Resorts, a collection of luxury properties along the Scottish Golf Coast opening in summer 2021 along with the recent purchase of the Slieve Donard in Newcastle County Down, Northern Ireland. Neighbours of the world famous Royal County Down Golf Course.

References

External links 
 Official site

Hotel chains in the United States
Companies based in Chicago